Peter H. Irons (born August 11, 1940) is an American political activist, civil rights attorney, legal scholar, and professor emeritus of political science. He has written many books on the U.S. Supreme Court and constitutional litigation.

Education 

Irons graduated from Antioch College (an early incubator of progressive politics).

He embarked on his current path in 1963 when he was sentenced to three years imprisonment at the Federal Correctional Institution in Danbury, Connecticut for refusing military induction on the ground that the Federal government perpetuated racial discrimination. While serving most of that sentence, he began corresponding with Howard Zinn, who sent him books on civil liberties and American politics. His conviction was ultimately reversed by a federal judge on the ground of prosecutorial misconduct. Later, President Gerald Ford granted him a pardon for refusing induction.

Career 
Irons completed a PhD at Boston University in 1973. Afterwards, Zinn helped arrange for him to work at a law firm defending Daniel Ellsberg, who was under federal prosecution at the time for stealing the Pentagon Papers. His work at the law firm would later serve as motivation for him to pursue a J.D. degree from Harvard Law School, which he received in 1978.

Upon graduating, he taught at Boston College Law School and the University of Massachusetts before moving to the University of California, San Diego. There in 1982 he established the Earl Warren Bill of Rights Project, of which he is the director. He was chosen in 1988 as the first Raoul Wallenberg Distinguished Visiting Professor of Human Rights at Rutgers University. He has lectured on constitutional law and civil liberties at the law schools of Harvard, Yale, Berkeley, Stanford, and more than 20 other schools.

He was also elected to two terms on the national board of the American Civil Liberties Union.

In addition to teaching and authoring several books, he has also helped reopen the wartime internment cases of Fred Korematsu, Minoru Yasui, and Gordon Hirabayashi. Judge Marilyn Hall Patel heard the Korematsu case.

He is an Emeritus Professor of Political Science at the University of California, San Diego and an author on legal history. He retired from the university in 2004 and now devotes some of his time to causes that interest him. He has undertaken some legal work in issues of the separation of church and state and written some articles for the Montana Law Review.

Starting in 1989, Irons represented the plaintiffs in the Mount Soledad case in San Diego, pro bono. He discontinued his involvement in the case in 1998 when threats made him fear for the safety of his two daughters.

Awards 
 1984 – Durfee Award
 1986 – UCSD certificate of excellence
 1989 – Ceil Podoloff Award by the American Civil Liberties Union (ACLU)
 1989 – American Bar Association Certificate of Merit award The Courage of Their Convictions: Sixteen Americans Who Fought Their Way to the U.S. Supreme Court

Works

Books 
 
 
 
 
 
 
 
 
 
 
2000 Silver Gavel Award Honorable Mention
 
 
2003 Silver Gavel Award Winner

Video courses

Articles

References

External links 
 University of California, San DiegoPeter H. Irons
 

 
 
 
 

American legal scholars
American legal writers
American political writers
American male non-fiction writers
American political scientists
21st-century American historians
21st-century American male writers
Historians of the United States
Internment of Japanese Americans
American anti-war activists
American civil rights activists
University of California, San Diego faculty
University of Massachusetts Amherst faculty
Harvard Law School alumni
Boston University alumni
Antioch College alumni
1940 births
Living people
Activists from California
American Book Award winners